Kevin Cannon is an American cartoonist and illustrator.

Life and career
Cannon first published work was Johnny Cavalier, published by Grinnell College Press, which included 100 pages of weekly strips that originally ran in the Scarlet and Black. While attending Grinnell, Kevin was often asked if he was Zander Cannon's brother, though the two bear no relation. This caused him to contact Zander at The Handicraft Guild in Minneapolis and began work as his assistant. Kevin did background illustrations for Smax, published by DC Comics and illustrated The Handsome Prince by author Tom Hegg. Kevin and Zander's working relationship eventually led to their founding of Big Time Attic with Shad Petosky. With Zander he went on to write the sequel to Alan Moore's Top Ten.

Working on his own he has produced Far Arden, a graphic novel about a journey described in one review as "382 pages of entertaining, action packed and genuinely funny adventure".

In 2010, Far Arden was nominated for an Eisner Award in the category "Best Publication for Teens".

In 2012, Kevin began serially publishing Crater XV, the sequel to Far Arden, in the digital publication Double Barrel from Top Shelf Productions. 
Last seen crossing the Nunavut boarder heading north .

Bibliography
Comics work includes:

Bone Sharps, Cowboys, and Thunder Lizards (with writer Jim Ottaviani, and other artists Zander Cannon and Shad Petosky, 168 pages, October 2005)
 "Quorzar 13, Honorable Conqueror of the Galaxy" (with Zander Cannon and Shad Petosky, in Negative Burn Winter Special, 2005)
 Top Ten: Season Two (with co-author Zander Cannon, and art by Gene Ha, 4-issue mini-series, America's Best Comics, December 2008 - March 2009)
The Stuff of Life: A Graphic Guide to Genetics and DNA (with writer Mark Schultz, and other artists Zander Cannon, 160 pages, Hill and Wang, January  2009)
T-Minus: The Race to the Moon (with writer Jim Ottaviani, and other artist Zander Cannon, 128 pages, Aladdin, May 2009)
Far Arden (400 pages, Top Shelf Productions, May 2009)
 Crater XV (496 page, Top Shelf Productions, May 2013)
The Cartoon Introduction to Philosophy with Michael F. Patton, April 2015)

References

External links

kevincannon.org
On be

to

American illustrators
Grinnell College alumni
Living people
Place of birth missing (living people)
Year of birth missing (living people)